Requiem is a 1966 composition by Boris Tischenko, to texts by Anna Akhmatova for soprano, tenor and symphony orchestra, Op. 35.

References

1966 compositions
Tishchenko
Anna Akhmatova